Histapyrrodine is an antihistamine with anticholinergic properties.

References 

H1 receptor antagonists
Pyrrolidines
Anilines